Mamuka Gongadze (born 21 October 1963 in Tbilisi) Georgian heraldry specialist, architect, artist. The author of the Georgian state coat of arms. Deputy Chairman of the State Council of Heraldry at the Parliament of Georgia.

Biography
Mamuka Gongadze was born on October 21, 1963 in Tbilisi, Georgia. He was studying at Tbilisi 48th secondary school. Graduated from the Tbilisi State Academy of Arts in 1988. Became a member of the Union of Georgian Designers in 1988. Same year 1988 he became a founder and a head of the design studio "Oshki". In the period of 1989-1992 he was employed by the "Tbilkalakproekti" Ltd and "Kurortpoekti" Ltd as an architect. Starting from 1993 he was working for The Ministry of Defense of Georgia , where, in 1995, he became a Chief of the Military Design Department. In 1995 he became a member of the Georgian State Heraldry Commission. In 1999 he became one of the founders and the Chairman of the Board of the NGO "Georgian Heraldry Association". In the period of 2005-2008 he is a member of the Georgian State Heraldry Commission at the President's office. In 2000 – a founder and a Chairman of the Board at the NGO "Studia Re". Starting from 2008 up to date - Deputy Chairman of the State Council of Heraldry at the Parliament of Georgia.

List of Works
1992 :File:1992 %E1%83%91%E1%83%90%E1%83%9C%E1%83%99%E1%83%9C%E1%83%9D%E1%83%A2%E1%83%98%E1%83%A1 %E1%83%94%E1%83%A1%E1%83%99%E1%83%98%E1%83%96%E1%83%94%E1%83%91%E1%83%98.jpg;:File:%E1%83%A1%E1%83%90%E1%83%9B%E1%83%AE%E1%83%94%E1%83%93%E1%83%A0%E1%83%9D %E1%83%AB%E1%83%90%E1%83%9A%E1%83%94%E1%83%91%E1%83%98%E1%83%A1 %E1%83%9B%E1%83%9D%E1%83%A1%E1%83%90%E1%83%9B%E1%83%A1%E1%83%90%E1%83%AE%E1%83%A3%E1%83%A0%E1%83%94%E1%83%94%E1%83%91%E1%83%98%E1%83%A1 %E1%83%A3%E1%83%9C%E1%83%98%E1%83%A4%E1%83%9D%E1%83%A0%E1%83%9B%E1%83%90.jpg; 
1993; 
1995 :File:%E1%83%A1%E1%83%90%E1%83%A1%E1%83%90%E1%83%96%E1%83%A6%E1%83%95%E1%83%A0%E1%83%9D %E1%83%AB%E1%83%90%E1%83%9A%E1%83%94%E1%83%91%E1%83%98%E1%83%A1 %E1%83%9B%E1%83%9D%E1%83%A1%E1%83%90%E1%83%9B%E1%83%A1%E1%83%90%E1%83%AE%E1%83%A3%E1%83%A0%E1%83%94%E1%83%94%E1%83%91%E1%83%98%E1%83%A1 %E1%83%A3%E1%83%9C%E1%83%98%E1%83%A4%E1%83%9D%E1%83%A0%E1%83%9B%E1%83%90, %E1%83%94%E1%83%9B%E1%83%91%E1%83%9A%E1%83%94%E1%83%9B%E1%83%90%E1%83%A2%E1%83%98%E1%83%99%E1%83%90 %E1%83%93%E1%83%90 %E1%83%A1%E1%83%98%E1%83%9B%E1%83%91%E1%83%9D%E1%83%9A%E1%83%98%E1%83%99%E1%83%90.jpg;
1997 :File:%E1%83%A1%E1%83%90%E1%83%9B%E1%83%AE%E1%83%94%E1%83%93%E1%83%A0%E1%83%9D %E1%83%93%E1%83%A0%E1%83%9D%E1%83%A8%E1%83%94%E1%83%91%E1%83%98.jpg;
1999 :File:%E1%83%9D%E1%83%A5%E1%83%A0%E1%83%9D%E1%83%A1 %E1%83%A1%E1%83%90%E1%83%AC%E1%83%9B%E1%83%98%E1%83%A1%E1%83%98%E1%83%A1 %E1%83%9D%E1%83%A0%E1%83%93%E1%83%94%E1%83%9C%E1%83%98, %E1%83%94%E1%83%A1%E1%83%99%E1%83%98%E1%83%96%E1%83%94%E1%83%91%E1%83%98.jpg;
2000 ; 
2001 :File:%E1%83%A1%E1%83%90%E1%83%A1%E1%83%90%E1%83%96%E1%83%A6%E1%83%95%E1%83%A0%E1%83%9D %E1%83%AB%E1%83%90%E1%83%9A%E1%83%94%E1%83%91%E1%83%98%E1%83%A1 %E1%83%93%E1%83%A0%E1%83%9D%E1%83%A8%E1%83%94%E1%83%91%E1%83%98.jpg;
2002 ;
2004 The Georgian State Coat of Arms (the initial version for the competition).:File:%E1%83%A1%E1%83%90%E1%83%A5%E1%83%90%E1%83%A0%E1%83%97%E1%83%95%E1%83%94%E1%83%9A%E1%83%9D%E1%83%A1 %E1%83%A1%E1%83%90%E1%83%AE%E1%83%94%E1%83%9A%E1%83%9B%E1%83%AC%E1%83%98%E1%83%A4%E1%83%9D %E1%83%92%E1%83%94%E1%83%A0%E1%83%91%E1%83%98%E1%83%A1 %E1%83%99%E1%83%9D%E1%83%9C%E1%83%99%E1%83%A3%E1%83%A0%E1%83%A1%E1%83%98 2004 - 1.jpg :File:%E1%83%A1%E1%83%90%E1%83%A5%E1%83%90%E1%83%A0%E1%83%97%E1%83%95%E1%83%94%E1%83%9A%E1%83%9D%E1%83%A1 %E1%83%A1%E1%83%90%E1%83%AE%E1%83%94%E1%83%9A%E1%83%9B%E1%83%AC%E1%83%98%E1%83%A4%E1%83%9D %E1%83%92%E1%83%94%E1%83%A0%E1%83%91%E1%83%98%E1%83%A1 %E1%83%99%E1%83%9D%E1%83%9C%E1%83%99%E1%83%A3%E1%83%A0%E1%83%A1%E1%83%98 2004 - 2.jpg :File:%E1%83%A1%E1%83%90%E1%83%A5%E1%83%90%E1%83%A0%E1%83%97%E1%83%95%E1%83%94%E1%83%9A%E1%83%9D%E1%83%A1 %E1%83%A1%E1%83%90%E1%83%AE%E1%83%94%E1%83%9A%E1%83%9B%E1%83%AC%E1%83%98%E1%83%A4%E1%83%9D %E1%83%92%E1%83%94%E1%83%A0%E1%83%91%E1%83%98%E1%83%A1 %E1%83%99%E1%83%9D%E1%83%9C%E1%83%99%E1%83%A3%E1%83%A0%E1%83%A1%E1%83%98 2004 - 3.jpg :File:%E1%83%A1%E1%83%90%E1%83%A5%E1%83%90%E1%83%A0%E1%83%97%E1%83%95%E1%83%94%E1%83%9A%E1%83%9D%E1%83%A1 %E1%83%A1%E1%83%90%E1%83%AE%E1%83%94%E1%83%9A%E1%83%9B%E1%83%AC%E1%83%98%E1%83%A4%E1%83%9D %E1%83%92%E1%83%94%E1%83%A0%E1%83%91%E1%83%98%E1%83%A1 %E1%83%99%E1%83%9D%E1%83%9C%E1%83%99%E1%83%A3%E1%83%A0%E1%83%A1%E1%83%98 2004 - 4.jpg :File:%E1%83%A1%E1%83%90%E1%83%A5%E1%83%90%E1%83%A0%E1%83%97%E1%83%95%E1%83%94%E1%83%9A%E1%83%9D%E1%83%A1 %E1%83%A1%E1%83%90%E1%83%AE%E1%83%94%E1%83%9A%E1%83%9B%E1%83%AC%E1%83%98%E1%83%A4%E1%83%9D %E1%83%92%E1%83%94%E1%83%A0%E1%83%91%E1%83%98%E1%83%A1 %E1%83%99%E1%83%9D%E1%83%9C%E1%83%99%E1%83%A3%E1%83%A0%E1%83%A1%E1%83%98 2004 - 5.jpg;
2005 :File:%E1%83%A1%E1%83%90%E1%83%AE%E1%83%94%E1%83%9A%E1%83%9B%E1%83%AC%E1%83%98%E1%83%A4%E1%83%9D %E1%83%92%E1%83%94%E1%83%A0%E1%83%91%E1%83%98 - 1.jpg:File:%E1%83%A1%E1%83%90%E1%83%AE%E1%83%94%E1%83%9A%E1%83%9B%E1%83%AC%E1%83%98%E1%83%A4%E1%83%9D %E1%83%92%E1%83%94%E1%83%A0%E1%83%91%E1%83%98 - 2.jpg;
2005 :File:%E2%80%9E %E1%83%AC%E1%83%9B%E1%83%98%E1%83%9C%E1%83%93%E1%83%90 %E1%83%92%E1%83%98%E1%83%9D%E1%83%A0%E1%83%92%E1%83%98%E1%83%A1 %E1%83%92%E1%83%90%E1%83%9B%E1%83%90%E1%83%A0%E1%83%AF%E1%83%95%E1%83%94%E1%83%91%E1%83%98%E1%83%A1 %E2%80%9C %E1%83%9D%E1%83%A0%E1%83%93%E1%83%94%E1%83%9C%E1%83%98 2005 St. George%27s Victory Order 2005.jpg; :File:%E2%80%9E %E1%83%94%E1%83%A0%E1%83%9D%E1%83%95%E1%83%9C%E1%83%A3%E1%83%9A%E1%83%98 %E1%83%92%E1%83%9B%E1%83%98%E1%83%A0%E1%83%98%E1%83%A1 %E2%80%9C %E1%83%9D%E1%83%A0%E1%83%93%E1%83%94%E1%83%9C%E1%83%98 2005 Order %E2%80%9C National Hero%E2%80%9D 2005.jpg;
2006 :File:%E1%83%9E%E1%83%90%E1%83%A2%E1%83%A0%E1%83%A3%E1%83%9A-%E1%83%98%E1%83%9C%E1%83%A1%E1%83%9E%E1%83%94%E1%83%A5%E1%83%A2%E1%83%9D%E1%83%A0%E1%83%94%E1%83%91%E1%83%98%E1%83%A1 %E1%83%A3%E1%83%9C%E1%83%98%E1%83%A4%E1%83%9D%E1%83%A0%E1%83%9B%E1%83%90.jpg;
2006-2009 :File:%E1%83%9B%E1%83%9D%E1%83%9C%E1%83%94%E1%83%A2%E1%83%90-2 %E1%83%9A%E1%83%90%E1%83%A0%E1%83%98, 50 %E1%83%97%E1%83%94%E1%83%97%E1%83%A0%E1%83%98.jpg:File:%E1%83%9D%E1%83%A5%E1%83%A0%E1%83%9D%E1%83%A1 %E1%83%A1%E1%83%90%E1%83%AC%E1%83%9B%E1%83%98%E1%83%A1%E1%83%98.jpg :File:%E1%83%98%E1%83%9A%E1%83%9D%E1%83%A0%E1%83%98, %E1%83%A1%E1%83%95%E1%83%94%E1%83%A2%E1%83%98%E1%83%AA%E1%83%AE%E1%83%9D%E1%83%95%E1%83%94%E1%83%9A%E1%83%98.jpg :File:%E1%83%95%E1%83%90%E1%83%9F%E1%83%90-%E1%83%A4%E1%83%A8%E1%83%90%E1%83%95%E1%83%94%E1%83%9A%E1%83%90, %E1%83%A5%E1%83%90%E1%83%A0%E1%83%97%E1%83%A3%E1%83%9A%E1%83%98 %E1%83%95%E1%83%90%E1%83%96%E1%83%98, %E1%83%AF%E1%83%95%E1%83%90%E1%83%A0%E1%83%98, %E1%83%94%E1%83%A0%E1%83%9D%E1%83%95%E1%83%9C%E1%83%A3%E1%83%9A%E1%83%98 %E1%83%91%E1%83%90%E1%83%9C%E1%83%99%E1%83%98 - %E1%83%9E%E1%83%A0%E1%83%9D%E1%83%94%E1%83%A5%E1%83%A2%E1%83%98.jpg :File:%E1%83%91%E1%83%90%E1%83%A5%E1%83%9D-%E1%83%97%E1%83%91%E1%83%98%E1%83%9A%E1%83%98%E1%83%A1%E1%83%98-%E1%83%AF%E1%83%94%E1%83%98%E1%83%B0%E1%83%90%E1%83%9C%E1%83%98, %E1%83%9A%E1%83%94%E1%83%AE %E1%83%99%E1%83%90%E1%83%A9%E1%83%98%E1%83%9C%E1%83%A1%E1%83%99%E1%83%98, %E1%83%AA%E1%83%94%E1%83%99%E1%83%95%E1%83%90 %E1%83%9B%E1%83%97%E1%83%98%E1%83%A3%E1%83%9A%E1%83%A3%E1%83%A0%E1%83%98.jpg;
2007- 2013;
1999-2009;
2012 :File:%E1%83%A3%E1%83%AA%E1%83%AE%E1%83%9D%E1%83%94%E1%83%97%E1%83%A8%E1%83%98 %E1%83%9B%E1%83%AA%E1%83%AE%E1%83%9D%E1%83%95%E1%83%A0%E1%83%94%E1%83%91%E1%83%98 %E1%83%97%E1%83%90%E1%83%9C%E1%83%90%E1%83%9B%E1%83%94%E1%83%9B%E1%83%90%E1%83%9B%E1%83%A3%E1%83%9A%E1%83%98%E1%83%A1 %E1%83%9B%E1%83%9D%E1%83%AC%E1%83%9B%E1%83%9D%E1%83%91%E1%83%90.jpg

References
http://heraldika.ge/index.php?m=2/&lng=eng

1963 births
Living people